N-(4-Methoxybenzylidene)-4-butylaniline (MBBA) is an organic compound often used as a liquid crystal.

References

External links
 NIST Webbook

Imines
Liquid crystals
Phenol ethers